Khazar, also known as Khazaric, was a Turkic dialect group spoken by the Khazars, a group of semi-nomadic Turkic peoples originating from Central Asia. There are few written records of the language and its features and characteristics are unknown. It is believed to have gradually become extinct by the 13th century AD as its speakers assimilated into neighboring Turkic-speaking populations. 

There is a dispute among Turkic linguists and historians as to which branch of the Turkic language family it belongs to. One consideration believes it belongs to the Oghur ("lir") branch of the Turkic language family, while another consideration is that it belongs to the Common Turkic branch.

Classification
 

There are many problems with exact classification of the Khazar language. One of the basic issues is the vague nature of the name Khazar itself. It has not yet been determined whether it refers to a specific Turkic tribe, or if it had a political and geographical origin that was not ethnolinguistic. The Khazar realm was a polyglot (multilingual) and polyethnic (multicultural) state, with Iranian, Finnic, Ugric, Slavic, and North Caucasian languages. According to anthropological data, it was ruled by Inner Asian Mongoloid (with some Europoid somatic elements) core tribes that accompanied the dynasty. The Turkic tribes probably spoke a number of Turkic languages. Scholars considered it a possibility that the term Khazar denoted one or even several languages; however, the sources cannot determine the extent of its use.

Chronicles of the time are unclear on Khazar's linguistic affiliation. The tenth century Al-Istakhri wrote two conflicting notices: "the language of the Khazars is different than the language of the Turks and the Persians, nor does a tongue of (any) group of humanity have anything in common with it, and the language of the Bulgars is like the language of the Khazars but the Burtas have another language." Al-Istakhri mentioned that population of Darband spoke Khazar along with other languages of their mountains. Al-Masudi  (896 – 956) listed Khazars among types of the Turks, and noted they are called Sabir in Turkic and Xazar in Persian. Al-Biruni (973 – 1050), while discussing the Volga Bulgars and Sawars (Sabirs), noted their language was a "mixture of Turkic and Khazar." Al-Muqaddasi (c. 945/946 – 991) described the Khazar language as "very incomprehensible." Ibn Hawqal, who travelled during the years 943 to 969 AD, wrote that "the Bulgar language resembles that of the Khazars".

Compared to the uniformity of Common Turkic, which Al-Istakhri mentioned "as for the Turks, all of them, from the Toquz Oghuz, Qirgiz, Kimek, Oguz, Qarluq, their language is one. They understand one another”. Even if Khazar belonged or was similar to Oghuro-Bulgaric languages, it was distinctly different.

The linguistic data consists of Khazar titles (Beg, Bolušči, Ishad, Il-teber/El-teber, Qağan, Kündü Qağan, Jâwšîġr, Tarxan, Tudun, Yabgu, Yilig/Yelig), anthroponyms (Itaq), and toponyms (Sarkel/Šarkil, Sarığšın/Sarığčın), mostly of Turkic origin. The interpretations do not indicate whether these are Common Turkic or Oghuric.

Vocabulary
With only one grammatical form attested—oqurüm, "I have read"—Khazar was stated by the 1986 Guinness Book of Records to have the "smallest literature" of any language.

See also
 Alsószentmihály inscription

Notes

Sources

External links
Khazaria.com

 
Turkic languages
Oghur languages